The 1985 Association of Mid-Continent Universities Tournament took place from May 10 through 12. The top 4 regular season finishers of the league's seven teams met in the double-elimination tournament held at Monier Field, home of the Eastern Illinois in Charleston, Illinois.  won the tournament for the second time.

Format and seeding
The top two teams from each division advanced to the tournament.  The top seed from each division played the second seed from the opposite division in the second round.

Tournament

References

Tournament
Summit League Baseball Tournament
Association of Mid-Continent Universities baseball tournament
Association of Mid-Continent Universities baseball tournament